Peter John Grant (born 15 August 1984 in Durban) is a South African rugby player.

He was educated at Maritzburg College in Pietermaritzburg where he matriculated in 2002. He played at fly-half for the Western Force in Super Rugby and since 2010, for the Kobe Kobelco Steelers in Japan's Top League.

He also played 5 tests for the Springboks team.

Super Rugby Statistics

References

External links
Kobelco Steelers profile

1984 births
Living people
Alumni of Maritzburg College
Expatriate rugby union players in Australia
Expatriate rugby union players in France
Expatriate rugby union players in Japan
Kobelco Kobe Steelers players
Rugby union fly-halves
Rugby union players from Durban
South Africa international rugby union players
South African expatriate rugby union players
South African expatriate sportspeople in Australia
South African expatriate sportspeople in France
South African expatriate sportspeople in Japan
South African people of British descent
South African rugby union players
Stellenbosch University alumni
Stormers players
Western Force players
Western Province (rugby union) players
White South African people